Jürg Götz, also spelled Juerg Goetz, is a former Swiss slalom canoeist who competed from the mid-1970s to the mid-1980s. He won a silver medal in the K-1 team event at the 1981 ICF Canoe Slalom World Championships in Bala.

References

External links 
 Juerg GOETZ at CanoeSlalom.net

Swiss male canoeists
Living people
Year of birth missing (living people)
Medalists at the ICF Canoe Slalom World Championships